Anongporn Promrat (born ) is a Thai female volleyball player. She was part of the Thailand women's national volleyball team.

She participated in the 2010 FIVB Volleyball World Grand Prix.

Awards

Clubs
 2013 Thai-Denmark Super League -  Bronze medal, with Ayutthaya A.T.C.C
 2013–14 Thailand League -  Bronze medal, with Ayutthaya A.T.C.C
 2014 Thai-Denmark Super League -  Champion, with Ayutthaya A.T.C.C
 2014–15 Thailand League -  Runner-up, with Ayutthaya A.T.C.C
 2015 Thai-Denmark Super League -  Bronze medal, with Ayutthaya A.T.C.C
 2015–2016 Thailand League -  Champion, with Bangkok Glass
 2016 Thai-Denmark Super League -  Champion, with Bangkok Glass
 2016–17 Thailand League -  Runner-up, with Bangkok Glass
 2017 Thai-Denmark Super League -  Runner-up, with Bangkok Glass
 2020 Thailand League -  Bronze medal, with Nakhon Ratchasima

References

External links
 FIVB profile

1992 births
Living people
Anongporn Promrat
Place of birth missing (living people)
Anongporn Promrat
Anongporn Promrat